The yellow-olive flatbill or yellow-olive flycatcher (Tolmomyias sulphurescens) is a species of bird in the family Tyrannidae. It is found in tropical and subtopical forest and woodland in Central and South America, but over its range there are significant variations in plumage, iris-colour and voice, leading to speculations that more than one species is involved. Its plumage is overall greenish-yellow, the lores are whitish, the crown is often greyish and some subspecies have a dusky patch on the auriculars. The flat bill is black above and pale pinkish or greyish below; similar to the yellow-margined flatbill, but unlike the grey-crowned flatbill.

References

Further reading

yellow-olive flatbill
Birds of Central America
Birds of South America
yellow-olive flatbill
Taxonomy articles created by Polbot